The Teatro Nuovo (New Theatre) is a theatre of the Republic of San Marino located in Dogana, a town in the Serravalle municipality ("castello"), not far from the border with Italy. It has a capacity of 872 seats of which 604 are in the stalls and is the largest theatre in the republic.

Events 
The final took place on 19 February 2022.

References

Buildings and structures in San Marino